This article is a list of notable individuals who were born in and/or have lived in Leavenworth, Kansas. For people whose only connection with the city is being incarcerated at one of the prisons in the city see List of inmates of United States Penitentiary, Leavenworth, United States Disciplinary Barracks#Notable inmates or Midwest Joint Regional Correctional Facility#Notable inmates, and for people whose only connection to the city is through the University of Saint Mary, see University of Saint Mary#Notable people.

Academia

R. H. Barlow (1918-1951), anthropologist, writer
Francis Samuel Drake (1828-1885), historian
Malcolm MacVicar (1829-1904), educator
Ernest Fox Nichols (1869-1924), physicist, president of Dartmouth College
Robert A. Scalapino (1919-2011), political scientist
Joseph Stayman (1817-1903), horticulturalist

Arts and entertainment

Film, television, and theatre
Hilda Clark (1872-1932), actress, model
Buffalo Bill Cody (1846-1917), showman, frontiersman, scout
Pat McMahon (born 1933), actor, disc jockey
Fred Meyers (born 1983), actor
Donn B. Murphy (born 1930), president of the National Theatre, theatrical advisor to the President of the United States
Brock Pemberton (1885-1950), theatrical director, producer, founder of the Tony Awards
Theresa Vail (born 1990), television host, Miss Kansas 2013
Richard Sanders actor, WKRP in Cincinnati

Journalism
Fred Lockley (1871-1958), columnist
James R. O'Neill (1833-1863), American Civil War correspondent and sketch artist
Elizabeth Vargas (born 1962), television news anchor

Literature
Yda Hillis Addis (born 1857), writer
Harold Coyle (born 1952), novelist
Bryan Penberthy (born 1976), poet

Music
Charles N. Daniels (1878-1943), composer, music executive
Melissa Etheridge (born 1961), singer-songwriter, guitarist
Gary Foster (born 1936), multi-instrumentalist
Randy Sparks (born 1933), singer-songwriter
J. White Did It (born 1984), record producer, songwriter, and DJ

Other visual arts
Alfred Shea Addis (1832-1886), photographer
William Pratt Feth (1866-1959), architect
William Merrell Vories (1880-1964), architect, missionary

Business
Joseph W. Bettendorf (1864-1933), manufacturing executive
Marie Guiraud (1830-1909), rancher
Fred Harvey (1835–1901), restaurant entrepreneur
Ron Logan (born 1938), business executive
William Waddell (1807-1872), mail service entrepreneur, co-founder of the Pony Express
Herbert M. Woolf (1880-1964), department store executive, racehorse owner

Crime and law enforcement

Thomas A. Cullinan (1838-1904), lawman
Wild Bill Hickok (1837-1876), lawman, gunfighter
 George Henry Hoyt (1837-1877), lawman, Kansas Attorney General

Military
Donald Prentice Booth (1902-1993), U.S. Army Lieutenant General
George P. Buell (1833-1883), U.S. Army Brevet Brigadier General, civil engineer
Herbert B. Crosby (1871-1936), U.S. Army major general who served as the Chief of Cavalry
John J. Davis (1909-1997), U.S. Army Lieutenant General
Billy Dixon (1850-1913), scout, buffalo hunter
Charles R. Jennison (1834-1884), U.S. Army Colonel, abolitionist, Kansas state legislator
Joseph E. Kuhn, commander of the 79th Division in World War I
Daniel McCook, Jr. (1834-1864), U.S. Army Brigadier General
David P. Muzzey (1838-1910), U.S. Army Lieutenant Colonel, lawyer
Herman Poggemeyer Jr. (1919-2007), U.S. Marine Corps Major General
David C. Schilling (1918-1956), U.S. Air Force Colonel, fighter ace
Richard J. Seitz (1918-2013), U.S. Army Lieutenant General
Persifor Frazer Smith (1798-1858), U.S. Army Brevet Brigadier General, Military Governor of California

Politics

National

Daniel Read Anthony (1824–1904), abolitionist, publisher
Lucien Baker (1846–1907), U.S. Senator from Kansas
Lloyd Llewellyn Black (1889–1950), U.S. federal judge
William Patterson Borland (1867–1919), U.S. Representative from Missouri
William M. Boyle (1902–1961), Democratic Party activist
David Josiah Brewer (1837–1910), U.S. Supreme Court justice
Alexander Caldwell (1830–1917), U.S. Senator from Kansas
Robert Crozier (1827–1895), U.S. Senator from Kansas
Mark W. Delahay (1828–1879), U.S. federal judge
Dwight D. Eisenhower (1890–1969), 34th President of the United States, General of the Army
Hugh Boyle Ewing (1826–1905), U.S. Ambassador to the Netherlands, U.S. Army Brevet Major General
Thomas Ewing, Jr. (1829–1896), U.S. Representative from Ohio
Thomas Ewing III (1862–1942), Commissioner of the U.S. Patent Office
Benjamin Joseph Franklin (1839–1898), U.S. Representative from Missouri
William Cather Hook (1857–1921), U.S. federal judge
Edward Jacobson (1891–1955), business associate of Harry Truman, advocate for the creation of Israel
Doug Lamborn (born 1954), U.S. Representative from Colorado
Charles Henry Langston (1817–1892), abolitionist, political activist
Cornelius Ambrose Logan (1832–1899), U.S. Ambassador to Chile, physician, writer
Walter Nelles (1883–1937), lawyer, pacifist, co-founder of National Civil Liberties Bureau
Marcus Junius Parrott (1828–1879), Kansas Territory delegate to U.S. Congress
Hiram Rhodes Revels (1827–1901), U.S. Senator from Mississippi
James B. Rhoads (1928–2015), 5th Archivist of the United States
Edward T. Taylor (1858–1941), U.S. Representative from Colorado
Donald S. Voorhees (1916–1989), U.S. federal judge
Lewis Ledyard Weld (1833–1865), Colorado politician
Abel Carter Wilder (1828–1875), U.S. Representative from Kansas
Robert Patterson Clark Wilson (1834–1916), U.S. Representative from Missouri

State

George T. Anthony (1824–1896), 7th Governor of Kansas
Cassius McDonald Barnes (1845–1925), 4th Governor of Oklahoma Territory
William A. Barstow (1813–1865), 3rd Governor of Wisconsin, U.S. Army Brigadier General
John A. Burns (1909–1975), 2nd Governor of Hawaii
Thomas Carney (1824–1888), 2nd Governor of Kansas
Powell Clayton (1833–1914), 9th Governor of Arkansas, U.S. Senator from Arkansas
Robert E. Davis (1939–2010), Kansas Supreme Court Chief Justice
William Larimer, Jr. (1809–1875), Kansas state legislator, founder of Denver, Colorado
Andrew Nisbet, Jr. (1921–2013), Washington state legislator
Edward Stillings (1823–1890), Kansas state legislator, judge
Samuel Hanson Stone (1849–1909), Kentucky politician

Religion
Sherwood Eddy (1871–1963), evangelist, missionary
Louis Mary Fink (1834–1904), Roman Catholic Church prelate
Isidor Kalisch (1816–1886), rabbi, writer
John Baptist Miège (1815–1884), Roman Catholic Church missionary
Paul Clarence Schulte (1890–1984), Roman Catholic Church prelate
Winfield Scott (1837–1910), Baptist minister
John Ward (1857–1929), Roman Catholic Church prelate

Sports

Baseball
Jake Beckley (1867–1918), first baseman
Chet Brewer (1907–1990), pitcher, scout, manager
Duff Cooley (1873–1937), outfielder
Johnny Hetki (born 1922), pitcher
Jack Killilay (1887–1968), pitcher
Walter McCoy (1923–2015), Negro leagues and Minor League Baseball pitcher
Fred Raymer (1875–1957), infielder

Basketball
Neil Dougherty (1961–2011), coach
Wayne Simien (born 1983), power forward

Other sports
Amy Hastings (born 1984), track and field athlete
Sean Malto (born 1989), skateboarder

See also
 List of lists of people from Kansas
 List of people from Leavenworth County, Kansas

References

Leavenworth, Kansas
Leavenworth